Stefan Kaiser (born 15 February 1983) is an Austrian ski jumper.

In the World Cup he finished twice among the top 10, with a seventh place from Oberstdorf in December 2000 as his best result. He finished third overall in the 2003/04 season of the Continental Cup.

He was a record holder of the longest jump at Pine Mountain ski jump.

At the 2005 Winter Universiade he finished 13th in the normal hill and 12th in the large hill. At the 2007 Winter Universiade he finished 10th in the normal hill and 8th in the large hill.

Notes

External links

Living people
Austrian male ski jumpers
1983 births